Sydney William Reeves (29 August 1891 – 22 May 1962) was an Australian rules footballer who played in the VFL between 1910 and 1919 for the Richmond Football Club.

References 

 Hogan P: The Tigers Of Old, Richmond FC, Melbourne 1996

External links
 
 

1891 births
Richmond Football Club players
Hawthorn Football Club (VFA) players
Australian rules footballers from Melbourne
1962 deaths
People from Williamstown, Victoria